Batherton is a rural civil parish in the unitary authority of Cheshire East and the ceremonial county of Cheshire, England. It lies immediately south of Nantwich and is jointly administered with the nearby settlement of Stapeley. The population was over 120 in 2011. The River Weaver runs along the western boundary, and its floodplain provides a habitat for wetland species, including the great crested newt and the nationally rare black poplar (Populus nigra subspecies betulifolia).

Governance
Batherton is administered by Stapeley and District Parish Council jointly with the larger adjacent parish of Stapeley. From 1974 the civil parish was served by Crewe and Nantwich Borough Council, which was succeeded on 1 April 2009 by the new unitary authority of Cheshire East. Batherton falls in the parliamentary constituency of Crewe and Nantwich, which has been represented by Kieran Mullan since 2019, after being represented by Laura Smith (2017–19), Edward Timpson (2008–17) and Gwyneth Dunwoody (1983–2008).

Geography, ecology and transport
It is rural, with the land use being predominantly agricultural. Farms include New Dairy House Farm, The Willow Farm, Mill Bank Farm, Mill Lane Farm, Batherton Farm, Hollies Farm and Grove Farm. Much of the area is classified by Cheshire Wildlife Trust (CWT) as "East Lowland Plain" with the south east being "Lower Farms and Woods". The River Weaver forms much of the western boundary, with a short stretch near Mill Bank Farm falling within the parish, and Ardle Brook runs along the southern boundary. The area around the Weaver and part of Ardle Brook has been described by CWT as having medium or high habitat distinctiveness and providing a significant corridor for wildlife. The Weaver floodplain harbours wetland species including the great crested newt and native black poplar (Populus nigra subspecies betulifolia), which are among the rarest British trees. There are several small areas of woodland within the parish, including Elliott's Wood, Millennium Wood and Smiths Millennium Wood. Numerous small meres and ponds are scattered across the area, particularly in Millennium Wood.

The A529 (Broad Lane) from Nantwich runs along or just to the east of the eastern boundary, and from it, no-through lanes serve New Dairy House Farm, and Batherton Hall, Mill Bank Farm and The Mill House. The Crewe and Nantwich Circular Walk, a long-distance footpath, runs from Broad Lane to Mill Bank Farm, where it crosses the Weaver via a footbridge.

Demography
In the 2001 census, the civil parish had a population of 36. In the 2011 census, Batherton had a recorded population of 124, in 52 households. The historical population figures are 25 (1801), 28 (1851), 29 (1901) and 58 (1951).

Landmarks

Two former farmhouses in the parish are listed at grade II, the lowest of the three grades. Batherton Hall is in red brick with stone quoins and a tiled roof; it dates originally from the mid-17th century and was subsequently extended with front and back bays and divided into two dwellings. Batherton Dairy House is an L-shaped, three-storey, red-brick building with basements and a tiled roof; it dates originally from the late 17th century and has also been divided into two dwellings.

Education

Stapeley Broad Lane Church of England Primary School dates from 1854 and straddles the boundary with Stapeley. For secondary education, the parish falls in the catchment area of Brine Leas School, just to the north of the parish in Nantwich.

See also

Listed buildings in Batherton

References

Source

External links

Stapeley & District Parish Council

Villages in Cheshire
Civil parishes in Cheshire